This article is about the demographic features of the population of the Central African Republic, including population density, ethnicity, education level, health of the populace, economic status,  religious affiliations and other aspects of the population.

There are more than 80 ethnic groups in the Central African Republic (CAR), each with its own language. About 50% are Baya-Mandjia, 40% Banda (largely located in the northern and central parts of the country), and 7% are M'Baka (southwestern corner of the CAR). Sangho, the language of a small group along the Oubangui River, is the national language spoken by the majority of Central Africans. Only a small part of the population has more than an elemental knowledge of French, the official language.

More than 55% of the population of the CAR lives in rural areas. The chief agricultural areas are around the Bossangoa and Bambari. Bangui, Berberati, Bangassou, and Bossangoa are the most densely populated urban centers.

Population 
The proportion of children below the age of 15 in 2010 was 40.4%, 55.6% were between 15 and 65 years of age, while 4% were 65 years or older.

Vital statistics 
Registration of vital events is not complete in the Central African Republic. The Population Department of the United Nations prepared the following estimates.

Source: UN DESA, World Population Prospects, 2022

Fertility and Births 
Total Fertility Rate (TFR) (Wanted Fertility Rate) and Crude Birth Rate (CBR):

Life expectancy

Other demographic statistics 

Demographic statistics according to the World Population Review in 2022.

One birth every 3 minutes	
One death every 9 minutes	
One net migrant every 25 minutes	
Net gain of one person every 6 minutes

The following demographic statistics are from the CIA World Factbook.

Population 
5,454,533 (2022 est.) Country comparison to the world: 119th
5,745,062 (July 2018 est.)
Note: estimates for this country explicitly take into account the effects of excess mortality due to AIDS; this can result in lower life expectancy, higher infant mortality and death rates, lower population and growth rates, and changes in the distribution of population by age and sex than would otherwise be expected (July 2015 est.)

Age structure 

0-14 years: 39.49% (male 1,188,682/female 1,176,958)
15-24 years: 19.89% (male 598,567/female 593,075)
25-54 years: 32.95% (male 988,077/female 986,019)
55-64 years: 4.32% (male 123,895/female 134,829)
65 years and over: 3.35% (male 78,017/female 122,736) (2020 est.)

0-14 years: 39.89% (male 1,151,724 /female 1,140,083)
15-24 years: 19.91% (male 574,969 /female 568,942)
25-54 years: 32.64% (male 938,365 /female 936,948)
55-64 years: 4.17% (male 112,310 /female 127,045)
65 years and over: 3.39% (male 75,401 /female 119,275) (2018 est.)

Median age 
total: 20 years. Country comparison to the world: 194th
male: 19.7 years
female: 20.3 years (2020 est.)

total: 19.8 years. Country comparison to the world: 197th
male: 19.5 years
female: 20.1 years (2018 est.)

Total: 21.4 years
Male: 19.6 years
Female: 20.2 years (2015 est.)

Population growth rate 
1.78% (2022 est.) Country comparison to the world: 52nd
2.11% (2018 est.) Country comparison to the world: 43rd
2.12% (2016 est.)

Birth rate 
32.79 births/1,000 population (2022 est.) Country comparison to the world: 23rd
34 births/1,000 population (2018 est.) Country comparison to the world: 24th

Death rate 
11.76 deaths/1,000 population (2022 est.) Country comparison to the world: 16th
12.9 deaths/1,000 population (2018 est.)

Net migration rate 
-3.22 migrant(s)/1,000 population (2022 est.) Country comparison to the world: 183rd
0 migrant(s)/1,000 population (2017 est.) Country comparison to the world: 78th

Total fertility rate 
4.04 children born/woman (2022 est.) Country comparison to the world: 27th
4.25 children born/woman (2018 est.) Country comparison to the world: 29th

Urbanization 
urban population: 43.1% of total population (2022)
rate of urbanization: 3.32% annual rate of change (2020-25 est.)

Sex ratio 
At birth: 1.03 male(s)/female
Under 15 years: 1.01 male(s)/female
15-64 years: 0.98 male(s)/female
65 years and over: 0.67 male(s)/female
Total population: 0.98 male(s)/female (2015 est.)

Life expectancy at birth 
total population: 55.52 years. Country comparison to the world: 226th
male: 54.19 years
female: 56.88 years (2022 est.)

male: 51.9 years (2018 est.)
female: 54.7 years (2018 est.)

Dependency ratios 
total dependency ratio: 90 (2015 est.)
youth dependency ratio: 83.1 (2015 est.)
elderly dependency ratio: 7 (2015 est.)
potential support ratio: 14.4 (2015 est)

Contraceptive prevalence rate 
17.8% (2019)
15.2% (2010/11)

School life expectancy 
total: 7 years (2012)
male: 8 years (2012)
female: 6 years (2012)

HIV/AIDS 
Adult prevalence rate: 4.7% (2009 est.)
People living with HIV/AIDS: 130,000 (2009 est.)
Deaths: 11,000 (2010 est.)

Major infectious diseases 
degree of risk: very high (2020)
food or waterborne diseases: bacterial and protozoal diarrhea, hepatitis A and E, and typhoid fever
vectorborne diseases: malaria and dengue fever
water contact diseases: schistosomiasis
animal contact diseases: rabies
respiratory diseases: meningococcal meningitis

note: on 21 March 2022, the US Centers for Disease Control and Prevention (CDC) issued a Travel Alert for polio in Africa; the Central African Republic is currently considered a high risk to travelers for polio; the CDC recommends that before any international travel, anyone unvaccinated, incompletely vaccinated, or with an unknown polio vaccination status should complete the routine polio vaccine series; before travel to any high-risk destination, CDC recommends that adults who previously completed the full, routine polio vaccine series receive a single, lifetime booster dose of polio vaccine

Nationality 
Noun: Central African(s)
Adjective: Central African

Ethnic groups 
An approximate distribution of the ethnic groups is shown in the chart below:

Religion 

Indigenous beliefs 35%, Protestant 25%, Roman Catholic 25%, Islam 15%

note: animistic beliefs and practices strongly influence the Christian majority

Languages 

Sango (lingua franca and official language), French (official), tribal languages

Literacy 
Definition: age 15 and over can read and write
Total population: 51%
Male: 63.3%
Female: 39.9% (2010 est.)

Urbanization 
urban population: 41.4% of total population (2018)
rate of urbanization: 2.52% annual rate of change (2015-20 est.)

See also 
Demographics of Africa
List of ethnic groups of Africa

References 

Attribution: